Edward Carre Morgan (May 22, 1904 – April 9, 1980) was a baseball player for the Cleveland Indians and Boston Red Sox.

Biography
Morgan was born May 22, 1904, in Cairo, Illinois.

Morgan entered the Major Leagues in 1928 with the Cleveland Indians. He played about half the season with them; over the next three years he became an everyday starter.

In 1930, his first full season, Morgan batted .349 with 47 doubles, 26 home runs, and 136 runs batted in. After the Indians refused him a raise for the following season, he reportedly threatened to quit baseball to go work for his wealthy father. In 1931, he batted a career-high .351.
After being sent down to New Orleans by the Indians in 1933, Morgan was selected by the Boston Red Sox in the Rule 5 draft on October 3. He made his final major league appearance with Boston in 1934, and eventually went on to work for his father.

Morgan died April 9, 1980 in New Orleans, Louisiana.

Career Statistics
In 771 games played over seven major league seasons, Morgan hit .313 (879-for-2810) with 512 runs scored, 186 doubles, 45 triples, 52 home runs, 473 RBI, 385 walks, a .398 on-base percentage and .467 slugging percentage. He compiled a career .983 fielding percentage.

References

External links

Major League Baseball infielders
Cleveland Indians players
Boston Red Sox players
Baseball players from Illinois
1904 births
1980 deaths